Steve Kerrigan (born 9 October 1972) is a Scottish former professional footballer who played for several clubs in the Scottish Football League and the Football League in the 1990s and 2000s. Is currently the assistant manager at East of Scotland outfits Rosyth alongside Greig Denham.

He was had various spells coaching at Junior level since ending his playing career, with the first of his managerial stints at Camelon Juniors in July 2009, succeeding Greig Denham. A short spell as boss of Arthurlie followed in 2016.

In January 2018, Kerrigan became manager at Bo'ness United having joined the club as assistant to Allan McGonigal in September 2017. In 2022 Steve joined Greig Denham at East of Scotland side Rosyth as his Assistant Manager.

References

External links

1972 births
Living people
Footballers from Bellshill
Scottish footballers
Association football forwards
Albion Rovers F.C. players
Clydebank F.C. (1965) players
Stranraer F.C. players
Ayr United F.C. players
Shrewsbury Town F.C. players
Halifax Town A.F.C. players
Stirling Albion F.C. players
Arbroath F.C. players
Berwick Rangers F.C. players
Stenhousemuir F.C. players
Scottish Football League players
English Football League players
Scottish football managers